The 14th Street station was an express station on the demolished IRT Second Avenue Line in Manhattan, New York City, located at the intersection of 14th Street and First Avenue. It had two levels. The lower level had three tracks and two side platforms and was served by local trains. The upper level had two tracks and two side platforms and was used by express trains. The next stop to the north was 19th Street for local trains and 42nd Street for express trains. The next stop to the south was Eighth Street for local trains and Chatham Square for express trains. The station closed on June 13, 1942.

References

External links

IRT Second Avenue Line stations
Railway stations closed in 1942
Former elevated and subway stations in Manhattan
14th Street (Manhattan)